Artati Marzuki-Sudirdjo (15 June 1921 – 19 April 2011) was an Indonesian diplomat and politician. She served as Minister of Basic Education and Culture	during the Dwikora Cabinet from 1964 to 1966.

Early Life 
Artati was born on 15 June 1921 in Salatiga, Dutch East Indies to R.Sudirdjo Djodjodihardjo and R.A Sumiati Reksohaminoto. Her father worked as chief engineer of Malabar Radio Station.

Career

Soekarno Era 
During Indonesian National Revolution, she worked at the Indonesian Red Cross Society Bandung Branch. Due to Bandung Sea of Fire, Artati moved to Dayeuhkolot and worked as an English radio broadcaster at Voice of Free Indonesia. Later, she moved to Yogyakarta and participated in the Ministry of Foreign Affairs diplomatic and consular course for one year. She completed it on May 1947. Afterward, she was appointed as a Politics and Consular staff at Ministry of Foreign Affairs

In 1950, she enrolled in University of Indonesia, majoring in law. However, she did not finish it. In the same year, she moved to New York and worked as a permanent representative of Indonesia to the United Nations for three years. In 1954, she returned to Jakarta and worked as Head of Social Affairs of the Directorate United Nations until 1958. From 1958-1961, Artati worked as Head of Politics of the Embassy of Indonesia in Rome, Italy. Afterwards, she served at the Directorate of International Organization Ministry of Foreign Affairs until 1964.

In 1964, Artati was appointed as the Minister of Basic Education and Culture, although she had no educational background. Her appointment aimed to resolve the conflict between two blocks in the education department which were Serikat Sekerja Pendidikan (SSP, Education Workers' Union) and Serikat Sekerja Pendidikan dan Kebudayaan (SSPK, Education and Culture Worker's Union). She held this position until February 1966.

Soeharto Era 
Afterward, she returned to the Ministry of Foreign Affairs and was appointed secretary general from 1966 to 1971. Then, in 1971, she became Inspector general of the Ministry of Foreign Affairs until 1973. After that, she took a job as a member of Supreme Advisory Council from 1973-1978. Subsequently, she became a member of the Department of Justice's Standing Committee on the Humanitarian Law Department until 1982. 

On June 1982, she served as the Indonesian Ambassador to Switzerland for one year. Subsequently, she became the Indonesian Ambassador to Austria, serving concurrently as Indonesian permanent representative to the UN and International Organization in Vienna. In 1985, she was elected as Chairperson of the IAEA Board of Governors and served it for one year. As a Chairperson of the IAEA's Board of Governors, she chaired a special meeting of the Board of Governors about Chernobyl disaster.

Death 
She died at 07:30 on Tuesday, 19 April 2011, and was buried in Kalibata Heroes Cemetery.

Personal Life 
Artati spoke English, Dutch, French, and Italian. She also passively understood German and Japanese.

References 

1921 births
2011 deaths
Rechtshogeschool te Batavia alumni
Indonesian diplomats
Indonesian women diplomats